Casmenae or Kasmenai (Casmene in Italian) was an ancient Greek colony located on the Hyblaean Mountains, founded in 644 BC by the Syracusans at a strategic position for the control of central Sicily. It was also intended as a military forward-position on the Via Selinuntina road that connected Syracuse to Akragas (modern-day Agrigento) - also on that road were Gela and Akrillai to Casmenae's west and Akrai to its east. Destroyed by the Romans in 212 BC, Casmenae was abandoned during the 3rd century BC and never inhabited again.

Historical origins
It was founded in 643 BC from Syracuse, 90 years after Syracuse's own foundation in 734 or 733 BC. There are several references to it in the historical sources, though few links to the main figures of the time and with several false accounts added. The most reliable source for it is Thucydides and his History of the Peloponnesian War. He writes:

The most reliably-attested events related to the city are as follows; perhaps in 553 BC, it fought alongside Syracuse against Camarina and the Siculi; there were also some Syracusan exiles, then brought back to Syracuse by Gelo in 485 BC; Dion landed at Heraclea Minoa and chose troops to lead against Syracuse. The city was abandoned around the end of the 4th century BC, with gradual Syracusan decadence, hence the relatively undisturbed nature of the site. To the south of ancient Casmene, on the site now known as "Terravecchia", is the former site of Giarratana (Jarratana), abandoned by its inhabitants in 1693.

Archaeological remains
This is solely made up of 38 parallel streets, all in a north-south direction. All the evidence suggests that Kasmenai (in the plural) was the name for a grouping of quarters. Arrows, daggers and spears have been found in the area, and basalt blocks still emerge from the earth – these blocks formed mills in the ancient city. Among the excavated remains are four houses and a temple that already existed before the settlers' arrival - the latter has polychromatic ceramic decoration and, judging by the several weapons found in it, associated with a warrior god.

See also 
 List of ancient Greek cities

Notes

Sources
Istituto Geografico de Agostini, Sicilia archeologica

Archaeological sites in Sicily
Ancient Greek archaeological sites in Italy
Syracusian colonies
644 BC
3rd-century BC disestablishments
Former populated places in Italy
Buildings and structures in the Province of Syracuse
Ancient cities in Sicily
7th-century BC establishments
Greek city-states